Bamnera is a small village situated along the inner margin of the southwestern part of the Thar Desert (The Great Indian Desert) in the foothills of Aravali mountain range with panoramic landscapes and a few sandy tracks. In more urban geographical terms, it is situated in the Sumerpur tehsil of Pali District in the state of Rajasthan, 12.5 km west of Sheoganj-Sirohi District from Beawar-Radhanpur NH 14.

Nestling at the foot of ‘Dhavalgiri’ Hill, locally well defined, as ‘Bhakree’ (भाकरी) on the bank of river ‘Brahmni’, which is a distributary of river ‘Sukri’, Bamnera is at a distance of 23 km (14.26 miles) from Jawai Bandh, (earlier known as Erinpura Road) railway station on the North Western Railway track. En route to Bamnera from Sheoganj, the road crosses the Sukri River. This intersection is called Fufaat. During monsoons, seasonal rains overflow its banks with a forceful current, and hence it is called Fufaat (Forceful). A concrete bridge called Pakki Rapat (पक्की रपट) is constructed on this river.

Etymology

In fact, as the name suggests, Bamnera is nothing but ancient Brahmananagarka (ब्रह्मणनगर), i.e., the town of the Brahmans. Bamnera is a corrupt name of Brahman-Nagar and over the course of time,  metamorphosed to local Marwari word 'Boman' and 'Dera' i.e. 'Bramhanera'. The word 'Boman' is derived from the Sanskrit/Hindi word Brahman and 'Dera' in Hindi means base or camp. Brahmin, in Sanskrit Brahmaṇa ("Possessor of Brahma"), highest ranking of the four varnas, or social classes, in Hindu India. The elevated position of the Brahmans goes back to the late Vedic period, when the Indo-European-speaking settlers in northern India were already divided into Brahmans (or priests), warriors (of the Kshatriya class), traders (of the Vaishya class), and labourers (of the Shudra class). Bamnera has a substantial population of Audichya Sahastra Gorwal Brahmins. The Brahmins, though represents a large percentage of Bamnera residents, is perhaps the most-notable section of the population; indeed, the village draws its name from that community. The Brahmin families after first migrating settled down into a life of farming and pastoralism and continued the traditional occupation of priesthood at the temples or at socio-religious ceremonies and rite of passage rituals such as solemnising thread ceremony (यज्ञोपवीत) as it's known worldwide, or a wedding with hymns and prayers. These original settlers called this place as 'Bramhanera' i.e. 'Bamnera'.

Climate

Broadly speaking, Bamnera has a tropical semi-arid desert climate and is a varying climate.

Summer: Summers are extreme. This is the period from April to June. The summer sets up by mid-March and temperature starts rising progressively through April, May and June. The heat during the summer is intense and temperature ranges from 32 ºC (89.9 ºF)  to 45 ºC (113 ºF). In May and June, the mercury rise up to of 48 ºC (118.4 ºF)  to 50 ºC (122 ºF).

The Loo (लू) is a strong, dusty, gusty, hot, and dry summer wind from the west that blows over extensive area. It is especially strong in May and June. Exposure to it often results in fatal heat strokes due to its extremely high temperatures (45°C – 50°C or 115°F – 120°F). Because of the extremely low humidity and high temperatures, the Loo has a severe drying effect on vegetation, causing widespread browning in the areas affected during the months of May and June. ‘Loo’, blow in the afternoon, and very often, they continue to well into midnight. Dust storms or sand storms (locally called as (वावर) in the afternoon are very common during the month of May. These temporary storms bring a welcome respite from the oppressing heat since they bring with them light rains and a pleasant cool breeze. Occasionally, the moisture-laden winds comes in sudden contact between dry hot winds  and  gives rise to local storms of great intensity. These local storms are associated with violent winds, torrential rains and even hailstorms during summers. The summer nights in Bamnera remains chilly with 20 °C to 29 °C temperature.

Winter: From October, the autumn season begins, and it starts to transform into winters during November. Extending from December to March are the months that fall under winter season. A considerable variation in maximum and minimum temperature is observed and the temperature mostly hovers between a minimum of 4°C and a maximum of 33°C. January is the coldest month of the year. The minimum temperature falls to 4 ºC in the night. A sharp decrease in night temperatures is experienced throughout the year on account of quick release of thermal radiation from the sandy soil soon after the dark. Climate is pleasant during winter and this is the ideal time to travel. The most important thing is that a number of fairs and festivals take place during winter.

Monsoon: Monsoon is almost erratic and arrives in late June. The monsoon rains brings relief to the sultry and sun-baked terrain of Bamnera. This period registers the maximum temperatures ranging from 29.5 ºC to 37.7 ºC. With the fall in temperature, humidity increases. Humidity is high during this period, particularly in the month of August. The mean annual rainfal is 250 mm to 300 mm. More than 90% of rainfall occurs during this period

History

Turning back the wheel of history. Bamnera is nothing but ancient Brahmanagaraka, ( ब्राह्मणनगरका),  i.e., the town of the Brahmans. The history of Bamnera is incomplete without the mention of Korta. The morden day Korta is no doubt the same as the ancient Korantaka or Koretaka or Korantakapur, which has given its name to a Jain gachcha, and which formerly not only included the present village of Korta, but had spread as far south as Bamnera. The whole ground between present day Korta and Bamnera is artificial, and is doubtlessly identified as the site of an ancient city Korantakapura (कोरंटकापुरा) by name, as said above. It was an extensive and prosperous town.  An inscription engraved on the back of the image of Lord Parasvanath [the 23rd of 24 Tirthankaras (ford-makers or propagators of dharma) of Jainism], in the temple of Mahavira at Pindwara in the Sirohi district, dated Vikram Samvat 1089 (1032 CE.), proves that it was in existence even earlier. In the 12th  century A.D., Korta formed a district of the Chauhan kingdom of Nadol. One of the Bamnera grants mentions one Maharajaputra Kumarasimha, who held this town of Korta as fief (जागीर). 

A significant set of Brahmin migrations, acquired with special skills took place between 500 CE and 1000 CE. Unlike the Vedic Brahmins, who only performed Yajna (Sanskrit: यज्ञ) for the material well-being of their patrons, the new Brahmins were known for establishing villages. Villages increased the expanse of cultivated lands, hence the income of kings. Thus, kings or ambitious warlords in those days would invite Brahmins to come to their kingdoms to establish temples, transforming village gods into local forms of mainstream Puranic gods (ancient gods). The deity of the temple was designated the real owner of the village. The king was merely a ruler, and the priest served both king and deity. The temple would then become the centre for tax collection. The brahmins thus enabled the king to become royal and expand his reach over the land. The lands grants received by Brahmins are known as Brahmadeya (ब्रह्मदेय:) and the lands where Brahmins stayed are called Agraharas or Arhats. Across the history we find many copper plates and stone inscriptions discussing how kings would give these lands to the Brahmins.

During the foundation of a house was being dug three copper plates were found by Shri Ramlal Khut, a Gorwal Brahman. These three copper plates were handed over to Archaeological Survey of India team in 1906. Earlier these three copper plates were kept in Government Museum, Ajmer. At present these copper plates are well preserved and kept in the Shri Bangar Government Museum, Pali, in Pali District, for interpreting the primary tangible evidence for the purpose to serve and facilitate educational and research resource to contribute to enrich the quality of ancient history. All these copper plates  refer themselves to the reign of Kelhana, son of Alhana, and register grants made to a Brahrnana in Korantaka  (the morden day Korta) named Narayana, son of Samdhirana, — two by Ajayasiniha, son of Maharajadiputra or the great Rajput Kumarasinha, and one by Kelhanadeva.

COPPER-PLATE GRANTS OF THE TIME OF THE CHAHAMANA (CHAUHAN) KING KELHANADEVA: 
The Banmera grant mentions one Maharajaputra Kumarasimha, who held this town of Korta in Jagir, Kelhanadeva and Ajayasimha gave charities to a Brahmana named Narayana of this place.

COPPER PLATE OF (V.S.1220) 1163 CE: Ajayasimha, son of Maharajaputra Kumarasimha, gave the grant of a land to a Brahmana named Narayana son of Samdhirana at village Koretaka, on the occasion of a solar eclipse in Vikram Samvat 1220, Sravana vadi 15 Budhe (Wednesday), i.e. (3 July 1163 A.D.) and consisted of a dohalika or doli, i. e., a piece of land granted to Brahmans, during the reign of Maharajadhiraja Alhanadeva, and his heir-apparent Kelhanadeva. The grant was approved by the sign manual of rajputra Shri Kirtipaladeva, the younger brother of Kelhanadeva who enjoyed a share in the administration of the kingdom during the reign of Kelhanadeva, as his sign manual are specified in the grant.

COPPER PLATE OF (V.S.1223) 1165 CE: The second Copper plate registers a grant of Maharajadhirja Shri Kelhanadeva of Chauhan dynasty ruling over the Nadula (the present day Nadol) mandala, consisting of a well with its treasures and trees located in the property (seja) of rajputra Ajayaraja in Korantaka (Korta). This grant was made in Vikram Samvat 1165, in Jyestha vadi 12th , Somware. i.e, 7 June 1165 CE. The donee is the same Brahman Narayan as in the preceding grant. The approval to the grant is made by sign manual of Kelhanadeva. Rajputra Ajayasiha was serving as a feudatory chief governing the estate while Kelhanadeva was ruling and his younger brother Rajputra Kirtipala was assisting him in all affairs of administration as governor.

COPPER PLATE (Undated): Another undated Copper Plate refers about the grant of a well (dhiko) to the same brahman Narayan son of Samdhirana at the village Korta (Korantaka) made by Ajayasiha, son of Raja Kumarasimha, on the holy occasion of Devautthapani Ekadashi during the reign of Kelhanadeva on 11th day of the Shukla paksh of Kartika month, but the day and year is not mentioned. 

INSCRIPTIONS ON SURYA NARAYAN TEMPLE:
Inscriptions are one of the significant source for history writing. They are important specimens for chronology as they are often physical objects contemporary in execution with their contents.  Dedicated to the Sun God Surya, the Surya Narayan temple is the only ancient temple at Bamnera. As far as about the old temple, the sabhamandap was in an utter ruin and had a porch erected in front of the shrine. The outside walls were old, and the temple was devoid of all ornamentation. The spire was not quit mordern. On one of the porch pillar inscriptions had been engraved. Of these three are dated Vikram Samvat 1258, and refers themselves to the reign of  Maharaja or Maharajadhiraja Samantasinha.

Dates of Maharaja Samantasinha’s time inscriptions on the pillars of Surya-Narayan mandir.

1) Vikram Samvat 1258, Magh Sudi 9, Sukre. (Friday, 4 January 1202 CE)

2) Vikram Samvat 1258, Chaitra Vadi 3, Some. (Monday 11 February 1202 CE)

3) Vikram Samvat 1258,  Vaisakha Sudi 12, Ravi. (Sunday, 5 May 1202 CE)

Of the remaining one has the date  Vikram Samvat 1348, Ashada vadi 5, Sukre, (Friday, 20 June 1292 CE) and records the grant, by a shilahaste (शिलाहस्ते), whose name is lost, of  three dharmaa (rupees) per Arhata or machine-well of the talapada or suburbs of Korantaka for the fair festival of the god Mahaswami i.e. the god Surya of Bamnera. This temple was again reconstructed in 2013 and now wears a new look. Only one inscription is extracted in the form of a block from the pillar and fixed at the bottom of the entrance. Other inscriptions along with the pillars lay aside in ruins. 
The village is dominated by a Gorwal Audichya Brahman community along with other castes such as Rajpurohits, Meenas, Suthars, Kumbhars, Rajputs, Harijans and Saads.

Demography

Bamnera is a medium-sized village located in Sumerpur in Pali district, Rajasthan with a total of 203 resident households. Bamnera has a population of 732 of which 361 are males while 371 are females as per the 2011 census.

In Bamnera village the population of children age 0-6 is 72 which makes up 9.84% of the total population of the village. 

Bamnera village has a higher literacy rate than most of Rajasthan. In 2011, the literacy rate of Bamnera was 66.97% compared to 66.11% for Rajasthan as a whole. Male literacy stands at 80.19% while the female literacy rate is 54.30%.

Bamnera has a substantial population of Scheduled Caste. Schedule Caste (SC) constitutes 26.64% while Schedule Tribe (ST) were 16.67% of the total population in Bamnera.

Of total population, 235 were engaged in work activities. 73.19% of workers describe their work as main work (employment or earning more than 6 months) while 26.81% were involved in marginal activity providing livelihood for less than 6 months. Of 235 workers engaged in main work, 25 were cultivators (owner or co-owner) while four were agricultural labourers.

As per constitution of India and Panchyati Raaj Act, Bamnera village is administrated by the sarpanch (head of the village) who is elected representative of the village.

Temples

On the eastern side of Bamnera, there is a small hill known as Tarwadio Ki Magri, but popularly known as Khimel Bhakri. There are a number of auspicious temples in Bamnera as mentioned below:

 Charbhujaji Mandir
 Kedareshwar Mahadev Temple
 Wagheswer Mahadev Temple
 Khimel Mata Temple
 Bhevmata Temple
 Pimpleshwar Temple
 Umiya Mata Temple
 Ramdevpir Temple
 Suryadev Temple
 Shri Korthaji tirth Jain Temple or Shri Korta Tirth Jain Mandir
 Varvesimata Temple
 Chamunda Mata Temple
 Shri Brahmani Mata Mandir (Kadarvavi)
 Shri Aapeshwar Mahadev Temple (Vanvavri)

Monuments, temples and public places in Bamnera and their functions:

Shamalaji/Charbhuja Temple (Dehra) : It is situated in the middle of Bamnera village. 

Shri Kedareshwar Mahadev Temple: This is a large temple, though not under the territory of Bamnera, but is still an important holy place for local functions. 

Shri Pimpleshwar Temple: It is situated on the bank of Brahmi (Sukadi river) originated from Gautameshwar. 

Shri Wagheshwar Temple: It is located on the bank of Jawai river.

Shri Aapeshwar and Koteshwar Temple: These temples are buried in the ground. They are under the restricted area of archaeological Survey of India.

Amenities

Pechka (Peska): This is one of the oldest sources of drinking water. It is situated in the middle of the Brahmi river (Sukadi). Water supply facilities are now provided by Rajasthan Water Supply Department. Presently, its water is used for cattle and other purposes.

Mithibai Rupalal Navalramji Charitable Trust: This trust had built a hospital cum primary health/medical center, which was inaugurated by Ex-Chief Minister, Shri Haridev Joshi.

Bhuralal Dungaji Secondary School: This school by Durgashanker Daulatramji Kevalramji along with other people. The school has pre-primary std 1 to std 10 class and has a large ground for sports.

Nohra (Nuru): Nohra is a place within any village equipped with all the facilities required for catering, cooking and eating arrangements. Bamnera has a huge 'Nohra' but still requires a renovation and better seating arrangement. There is one more 'Nohra'. Though it is comparatively small in size, it is useful in small ceremonies like Yagnopavit and marriages.

Gaushala: Gaushala is managed by Shri. Bamnera Gaurakshak Charitable Trust. Normally, this trust is headed by the active sarpanch.

Shri Bamnera Jankalyan Mandal: Shri Bamnera Vidhtya Prakashan Mandal and Shri Bamnera Jankalyan Mandal is effectively and efficiently working in the village as well as in Mumbai.

Cuisine

Cuisine is predominantly vegetarian and dazzling in its variety. Food is cooked with minimal use of water and people prefer to use more milk, buttermilk and clarified butter. Dried lentils, beans from indigenous plants like sangri and ker are used liberally. Gram flour is a key ingredient and is used to make food such as kachori, bhajiya, gatte ki sabji, pakodi; powdered lentils are used for papad. Bajra and corn are commonly used. Raabdi, khichdi, dal-dhokdi and rotis such as makki ri ghat and bajra ra hogra are also popular. Various chutneys are made from locally available spices like turmeric, coriander, mint and garlic.

The spice content is on the higher side, even by Indian standards. The most famous dish is likely dal-bati, which are spicy lentils with baked balls of wheat with much ghee. The variety of sweet dishes is also immense and sweets are relished as much as the spicy curries. Some popular sweet dishes are daadi ru hiru, vasaniyu, mootichur, boondi, kharmoo ra ladoo, and sutarfini.  is a saying meaning "you become the one who considers that Guests are equivalent to God", and is shown in the community by guests being fed with affection, also termed manuhar or manvar. It is considered rude to lay the food on the table and expect guests to serve themselves.

Sweet dishes are never referred to as dessert. Unlike desserts which are had after the meal, sweets are had before, during, and after the meal. Dal baati (lentils and hard wheat rolls), often left over, are used in a delicacy known as churma. Traditionally it is made by mashing up wheat flour baati or left over roti in ghee (clarified butter) and jaggery (unrefined cane sugar).

Music and entertainment

Folk songs are sung by women during marriages and other social occasions. Many villagers own TVs and radios. One can hear sounds of popular native songs in the form of bhajans as well as Hindi music emanating from stereos and other devices during evenings and afternoons from different houses.

Games and sports

Most of the children play cricket, gillidanda, and marbles. Some villagers also play volleyball and football. Villagers can be seen playing cards at the premises of Pimpleshwar Mahadev Mandir. Some children play tass patti of match box.

Festivals

Villagers celebrate all major Hindu festivals including Holi, Deepawali, Makar Shakranti, Raksha Bandhan, and Teez. Villagers celebrate Holi and Dhuleti for 15 days. Most people perform Gair dance in the village.  Usually, people spend the day throwing coloured powder and water at each other. A special drink called thandai is prepared, sometimes containing bhang (Cannabis sativa). People invite each other to their houses for feasts and celebrations later in the evening. Unlike others who use longer-lasting and stronger artificial colours, villagers prefer to use coloured powders which have medicinal significance and are traditionally made of neem, kumkum, turmeric, bilva, and other medicinal herbs.

Economics

Like other villages, many local people have migrated from Bamnera to different regions of Maharashtra, Madhya Pradesh and Gujarat in search of better opportunities. Some people have also excelled in the field of engineering, medical, banking, computers and IT Technologies. There are several people located in foreign countries as well.

How to reach Bamnera

By air: The nearest airport is Jodhpur or later on Udaipur.
By road: Rajasthan bus transport services are available from Ahmedabad or the nearest stop is Sheoganj.

Nearby cities and towns
East: Sheoganj—, Sumerpur—
North: Takhatgarh—
West: Jalore District
South: Sirohi—

References

External links

 Bamnera on tripod
 Bamnera
 

Villages in Pali district